Robert A. Pascal (July 20, 1934 – March 12, 2021) was an American Republican politician, collegiate football player, professional Canadian football player and a propane entrepreneur who served as County Executive of Anne Arundel County, Maryland from 1975 to 1982.

Early life
Pascal was born in Glen Ridge, New Jersey. He was raised in Bloomfield, New Jersey, where his father worked in the local school district, and he attended Bloomfield High School. He played football at Duke University. During this time, Pascal earned first team All-American as a halfback in 1955. He led the Duke Blue Devils in rushing for two seasons, and was named team MVP in 1955. He was also a two time first team All-ACC selection. After graduating from Duke in 1956, Pascal was drafted in the third round by the Baltimore Colts. Pascal instead decided to play in the Canadian Football League for the Montreal Alouettes. During his one season in the league, he played for the Grey Cup.

Career

After playing in the Canadian Football League, Pascal then moved back to the United States and entered the propane business. He eventually bought his own company, United Propane, and built it into one of the top 25 in the country. Pascal sold the company to Inergy, L.P. in 2003. Pascal also entered politics.

Pascal was a State Senator from 1971 to 1974. From 1974 to 1982 he served as the Anne Arundel County Executive and was key to the creation of Kinder Farm Park, which he had the county buy from the Kinder family.

Pascal was the Republican nominee for Governor of Maryland in 1982, losing to incumbent Harry R. Hughes. Pascal served as the Secretary of Appointments to Governor William Donald Schaefer from 1989 to 1995.

Legacy 
The following have been named after Bob Pascal:
 Pascal Field House, Duke University, Durham, North Carolina
 Pascal Senior Center, Glen Burnie, Maryland — Anne Arundel County's first senior center
 Pascal Center for the Performing Arts, Anne Arundel Community College, Arnold, Maryland
 Pascal Field, St. Mary's High School, Annapolis, Maryland
 Robert A. Pascal Youth & Family Services, Inc., Odenton, Maryland

Philanthropy
Pascal donated $6 million to Duke University to help fund the construction of an indoor practice facility for the Duke football team. The facility was later named the Pascal Field House in his honor.

Personal life
Pascal had four daughters, Catherine Anne, Margaret, Clara, and Robin.

References

1934 births
20th-century American politicians
2021 deaths
American athlete-politicians
American energy industry businesspeople
American players of Canadian football
Anne Arundel County Executives
Bloomfield High School (New Jersey) alumni
Duke Blue Devils football players
Duke University alumni
Republican Party Maryland state senators
Montreal Alouettes players
People from Bloomfield, New Jersey
People from Glen Ridge, New Jersey
Players of American football from New Jersey
Sportspeople from Essex County, New Jersey